José Jonathan Piña Gutierrez (born 16 June 1989) is a former Mexican football midfielder who played for C.F. La Piedad. He previously played for Club Atlas, and for Querétaro in the Primera Division de Mexico.

References

External links

1989 births
Living people
Association football midfielders
Atlas F.C. footballers
Querétaro F.C. footballers
Footballers from Aguascalientes
Mexican footballers